Ophonus laticollis is a species of ground beetle in the subfamily Harpalinae, subgenus Ophonus (Metophonus). It is widespread in Europe.

References

laticollis
Beetles of Europe
Beetles described in 1825
Taxa named by Carl Gustaf Mannerheim (naturalist)